The Prime Minister of Assam was the head of government and the Leader of the House in the Legislative Assembly of Assam Province in British India. The position was dissolved upon the Partition of India in 1947.

History 
The office was created under the Government of India Act 1935. During the 1937 Indian provincial elections in Assam, the Indian National Congress emerged as the single largest party. But due to its pan-Indian policy of boycotting constitutional government under the British Raj, it refused to form government and became the main opposition party. Hence, the governor invited the Assam Provincial Muslim League, led by Sir Syed Muhammad Saadulla, to form the government in April 1937. The first Saadulla ministry collapsed in September 1938. The Assamese Congress, led by Gopinath Bordoloi, claimed the right to form government and was invited by the governor to do so on 21 September. The Bordoloi ministry saw the beginning of World War II. After a request from Mohandas Karamchand Gandhi, the Bordoloi ministry resigned in 1939. Across India, Congress leaders including Bordoloi were arrested in 1940 due to the Congress's strong opposition to war efforts. The Congress was briefly outlawed during the Quit India movement. Saadulla was invited to form two ministries in 17 November 1939 and 24 August 1942, with intervening periods of Governor's rule in between. Saadulla served as Prime Minister for a total of 9 years. Bordoloi was released in 1944. During the 1946 Indian provincial elections, the Congress led by Bordoloi received a majority and formed government once again. On 6 July 1947, the Sylhet referendum voted for the partition of Muslim-majority Sylhet district from Assam; and merger with East Bengal. Bordoloi later became the first Chief Minister of Assam after Indian independence in 1947.

Office holders

See also
Legislatures of British India

References

Provinces of British India
Prime Ministers of British India